Axinoscymnus puttarudriahi, is a species of lady beetle native to India and Sri Lanka.

Description
Body length is about 1 to 2 mm. Body brownish. Elytra hairy with black patches.

Biology
Adult lady beetles can be used to control the whitefly species Aleurothrixus trachoides that infesting Capsicum annuum. It is also a major predator of Aleurodicus dispersus that attack banana plantations, guava and Bemisia tabaci on chillie and star gooseberry. Adults usually feed on the eggs of the whitefly. In Sri Lanka, it is known to feed on two major pests, Aphis gossypii and Myzus persicae.

The peak abundance of the beetle has observed in the months of September to October.

References 

Coccinellidae
Insects of Sri Lanka
Beetles described in 1965